Valther Valdemar Jensen (1 March 1888 – 15 March 1982) was a Danish track and field athlete who competed in the 1920 Summer Olympics. In 1920 he finished seventh in the discus throw competition. He was the 1916 Danish shot put champion.

References

External links
List of Danish athletes

1888 births
1982 deaths
Danish male discus throwers
Danish male shot putters
Olympic athletes of Denmark
Athletes (track and field) at the 1920 Summer Olympics
Athletes from Copenhagen